Chrysler's C platform was the basis for rear wheel drive full-size cars from 1965 to 1978. Although often misclassified, 1964 and earlier full-size Chrysler products, and 1966 and earlier Imperials are not C-bodies.

Wheelbases:
 119 in
 1965-1968 Plymouths (except wagons)

 121 in
 1965-1966 Plymouth wagons
 1965-1966 Dodge Monaco sedan
 1965-1966 Dodge Polara sedan
 1965-1966 Chrysler wagons
 121.5 in
 1975-1977 Plymouth Gran Fury (except wagons)
 1974-1977 Dodge Monaco (except wagons)
 122 in
 1967-1973 Plymouth wagons
 1974 Plymouth Fury III/Gran Fury
 1967-1973 Dodge Monaco sedan
 1967-1973 Dodge Polara sedan
 1967-1973 Chrysler Town & Country
 120 in
 1969-1974 Plymouth Fury (except wagons)
 124 in
 1974-1977 Plymouth and Dodge wagons
 1965-1971 Chrysler 300
 1965-1978 Chrysler New Yorker sedans
 1965-1978 Chrysler Newport 
 1974-1978 Chrysler Town & Country
 1974-1975 Imperials
 127 in
 1967-1973 Imperials

1988

The "C" name was revived as the basis of Chrysler's new K-based mid-size front wheel drive cars. 

Cars that used the front wheel drive C:
 1988-1993 Chrysler New Yorker
 1988-1993 Dodge Dynasty

See also
 Chrysler platforms

Chrysler platforms